Deering High School (DHS) is a public high school in Portland, Maine, United States. The school is part of the Portland Public Schools district.

It is one of the three public high schools located in Portland, the others being Portland High School and Casco Bay High School. Along with Portland High, enrollment to Deering is open choice by the family.

History

Deering High School was established in 1874 after Deering, Maine, seceded from Westbrook, Maine, in 1871. It is named after the town of Deering, which was later annexed by the City of Portland in 1898. The first Deering High School building eventually became Longfellow Elementary. The second building was completed in 1889. It burned down in 1921, but was saved and converted into Lincoln Middle School in 1923.

The first session opened in Morgen's hall, a one-room wooden structure, at Morrill's Corner, in the fall of 1874 with 31 students attending. Before the end of the year, the high school moved to the Heseltine Grammar School on Ocean Avenue where it remanded for four years; crowded conditions existed at Heselton. Five students graduated in the first class. There were two sessions daily and, as late as 1895, school was held six days a week. The courses were similar to those of our present Algebra and Latin. However, a student had no choice in subjects, but was compelled to take all those offered in order to be graduate.

In 1878, Deering moved to the old wooden Longfellow School which was located opposite from Central Square Baptist Church. Seventy students were enrolled; however, the school was so large that the ground floor was used by the student body. Mr. F. E. C. Robbins was principal. In 1887, two new courses were re-organized and renamed the Commercial Department. The first edition of the school newspaper, The Breccia was published in 1887. In 1889, Deering became part of the City of Portland. When the Enabling Act was before legislature, Fred Matthews, a graduate of Deering who was then practicing law in the city, included in the act a provision for the "continuing" maintenance always of a high school in Deering of equal grade and standing. This led to Portland having two high schools.

By 1897, with Mr. E. H. Crosby as principal, the school had grown so plans were made for a new building which was to have fourteen recitation rooms, a library and a large assembly hall. Loud and long were the protestations that such a building was a wicked waste of money since four classrooms would do nicely – and why a library? In 1889, however, work was started on the construction of the main building of what is now known as Lincoln Middle School. Just before the building was to be occupied, Mr. Crosby, Principal, was killed by a train at "Woodfords Crossing" during a rain storm. His term was completed by Mr. Swan and Mr. Hill. In 1898, on January 30, the new Deering High School was opened with Principal William H. Marvin in charge. The Assembly Hall, which was located on the third floor, was dedicated to Mr. Crosby and remained in his name until the hall was renovated into a library.

From 1902 to 1909, John M. Nicholas served as principal; from 1909 to 1913, Herbert I. Allen was the principal; and from 1913 to 1919, Louis B. Farnham, was chief administrator of Deering. Yet only fourteen years after 1898, the school has grown so that an addition, the Annex of Lincoln Junior High was built. In this building, the school's disaster occurred, the fire of May 1921. The library and classrooms in the main building were entirely destroyed. For the remainder of the year, classes were held in the Annex and in two local churches. Under the administration of William E. Wing, principal of Deering from 1919 until 1942, the present Deering was built and enlarged. In 1922, the main building was constructed and housed 826 students, and in 1932 a small wing was added to complete the structure. The athletic field was laid out and many extra curricular activities were started. The school newspaper was named The Purple Line in 1929 and changed to the present name Ramblings in 1940. Carlton Wiggin was head of Deering through the years of World War II.

In the fall of 1960 Deering became a three year high school for the first time. Freshmen were scheduled at the four-hour schedule in junior high schools. Sophomores, juniors, and seniors occupied the Stevens Avenue School in which many improvements had been made during the summer. The school day was extended from 1:05 P.M. to 2:10 P.M., and included seven periods – each forty-five minutes long. In the fall of 1979 Deering became once again a four-year school. Mr. Wiggin retired in 1967 and was succeeded by Donald G. Hale. During the 1976 school year, The Deering High School Study Committee was formed to assess the physical plan and program offerings. During the 1978 school year, a DHS Building Committee with architectural firm Wadsworth, Boston, Dimick, Mercer & Weatherill began designing the new addition. Plans were presented to the State Board of Education on July 9, 1980, and then to referendum on September 23, 1980, which passed. Construction of the new addition began in the summer of 1981 when David Wallace became the new principal of Deering High School. Mr. Hale continued on the stuff as the Building Project Coordinator. With the 1982–83 school year, students and staff utilized all newly constructed and renovated areas of Deering High School. Included in first group of the high schools recognized nationally, Deering was named a National School of Excellence by the United States Department of Education in 1983. In 1985, Paul A. Pendleton became the Principal of Deering High School. Under his leadership the provisions of Maine's Educational Reform Act were implemented, and ten years NEASC re-accreditation was awarded. The Portland School Committee confirmed Jan C. Patton as principal in July 1992. Patton served 3 years. The challenge of her tenure was the successful planning for and adoption of block scheduling.

Curriculum
Deering was one of 34 high schools nationally which had joined the International Studies School Network, which is part of the Asia Society. The school later chose to not renew its ISSN membership due to fees. In October 2013, Deering High School announced it would offer an Arabic language course as part of their new international curriculum. It was believed to be the first Arabic language course in Maine public schools.

Sports
Memorial Stadium is located on Ludlow Street near Deering High School, it is an artificial turf surface and is the home field for DHS outdoor sports teams.

The Deering Rams won the Maine Class A Boys' State Basketball Championship on March 3, 2012.

The Deering High School and Portland High School football teams have played each other each Thanksgiving since 1911, except for 1920 and 2020.

Notable alumni
 Thomas H. Allen, United States Representative from Maine (1997–2008)
 Nik Caner-Medley, professional basketball player
 Don Favor, hammer thrower
 Ryan Flaherty, professional baseball player
 Irving Folwartshny, hammer and weight thrower
 Robert F. Griffin, CSC, writer
 Nathaniel Mervin Haskell, Governor of Maine
 Wilbur R. Ingalls Jr., architect
 Heidi Julavits, author
 Anna Kendrick, actress and singer
 Linda Lavin, actress
 Bob Marley, stand-up comedian
 Andrea Martin, actress
 Annie Proulx, writer
 Ryan Reid professional baseball player
 Fred C. Scribner Jr., under-secretary of the Treasury under Dwight D. Eisenhower, class of 1926.
 Earle G. Shettleworth Jr., state historian, Class of 1966
 Edward Whittemore, writer (class of 1951)
 Ed Phillips, professional baseball pitcher for the Boston Red Sox

Notes

External links
 Deering High School homepage

Educational institutions established in 1874
Public high schools in Maine
Schools in Portland, Maine
Clock towers in Maine
1874 establishments in Maine
 
High schools in Cumberland County, Maine